Black Bridge is a 2006 Canadian drama/comedy film.

Black Bridge, Blackbridge, or BlackBridge may also refer to:

Bridges
 Black Bridge (The Nilgiris), a bridge in The Nilgiris District, Tamil Nadu, India
 Nuneham Railway Bridge or the Black Bridge, a railway bridge in England near Abingdon, Oxfordshire
 Telescopic Bridge, Bridgwater or the Black Bridge, a retractable railway bridge in Bridgwater, Somerset, England
 The Black Bridge, a bridge across the River Shannon, at Plassey, County Limerick, Ireland
 Black Bridge, a bridge across Black Water (Conon), a river in the Highlands of Scotland
 Black Bridge, a bridge in Glen Lui on the Mar Lodge Estate, in Aberdeenshire, Scotland
 Black Bridge, a bridge over the Waiohine River near Carterton, New Zealand
 Black Bridge, a bridge on State Highway 6 over the Mataura River near Athol, New Zealand

Organizations
 BlackBridge AG, owner/operator of RapidEye, a constellation of earth observation satellites

See also
 Black Hawk Bridge, a bridge spanning the Mississippi River
 Black River Bridge (disambiguation)
 Černý Most (English: "Black Bridge"), a housing estate in Prague
 Negroponte (disambiguation)
 White Bridge (disambiguation)
 Whitebridge (disambiguation)